Charlie and the Great Glass Elevator is a children's book by British author Roald Dahl. It is the sequel to Charlie and the Chocolate Factory, continuing the story of young Charlie Bucket and chocolatier Willy Wonka as they travel in the Great Glass Elevator. The book was published in the United States by Alfred A. Knopf, Inc. in 1972, and in the United Kingdom by George Allen & Unwin in 1973.

Although the original book has enjoyed several screen adaptations, The Great Glass Elevator has never been adapted for a visual medium; however it was adapted for audio by Puffin Audio Books starring Neil Answych as Charlie Bucket and Gordan Fairclough as Willy Wonka, and the second half of a BBC adaptation for Radio 4 in 1983.

Plot

The story picks up where the previous book left off, with Charlie and family aboard the flying Great Glass Elevator after Willy Wonka has rewarded him with the ownership of his chocolate factory. The Elevator accidentally goes into orbit, and Mr. Wonka docks them at the Space Hotel USA. Their interception of the hotel is mistaken by approaching astronauts and hotel staff in a Commuter Capsule and listeners on Earth (including U.S. President Lancelot R. Gilligrass) as an act of space piracy and they are variously accused of being enemy agents, spies and aliens. Shortly after their arrival, they discover that the hotel has been overrun by dangerous, shape-changing alien monsters known as The Vermicious Knids.  The Knids cannot resist showing off and reveal themselves by using the five hotel elevators (with one Knid in each of them) and spell out the word "SCRAM", giving the group time to evacuate. As the group leaves, a Knid follows the Great Glass Elevator and tries to eat the occupants. However Willy Wonka designed his elevator to protect from Knid attacks and the Knid's tail gets bruised, which makes it swear revenge against Wonka.

Meanwhile, with the Great Glass Elevator's passengers gone, the President allows the Commuter Capsule to dock with the Space Hotel.  Upon entry by the astronauts and the Space Hotel staff, the Knids attack by eating fourteen of the staff, prompting an immediate evacuation by the rest of the group.  The Great Glass Elevator comes back just in time to see the entire Knid infestation coming in on the attack, bashing the Commuter Capsule to the point where the retrorockets cannot be fired to initiate immediate reentry and the communication antenna cannot keep the astronauts in communication with the President.  Charlie suggests towing the Commuter Capsule back to Earth, and, despite a last attempt by the Knids to tow the two craft away to their home planet Vermes, in the process the Knids are incinerated in Earth's atmosphere. Mr. Wonka releases the Commuter Capsule, while the Elevator crashes down through the roof of the chocolate factory.

Back in the chocolate factory, three of Charlie's grandparents refuse to leave their bed. Mr. Wonka gives them a rejuvenation formula called "Wonka-Vite". They take much more than they need (4 pills instead of 1 or 2), subtracting 80 years (which reduces their age by 20 years per pill). Two become babies, but 78-year-old Grandma Georgina vanishes, having become "−2". Charlie and Mr. Wonka journey to "Minusland", where they track down Grandma Georgina's spirit.  As she has no physical presence, Mr. Wonka sprays her with the opposite of "Wonka-Vite" – "Vita-Wonk" – in order to age her again.  Mr. Wonka admits that it is not an accurate way to age a person, but the spray is the only way to dose "minuses". Upon leaving Minusland, they discover that Grandma Georgina is now 358 years old. Wonka combines multiple dosages of Wonka-Vite to rejuvenate Georgina; as she gets younger she recalls events in history. Using cautious doses of Vita-Wonk, the three grandparents are restored to their original ages.

Immediately afterwards, Willy Wonka gets a telegram from President Gilligrass. The President realizes that they were not extraterrestrials when radar tracked the glass elevator to Wonka's factory, and thanks everyone for saving 136 people. President Gilligrass invites everyone to the White House (as well as asking for a couple of Wonka bars). The family and Wonka accept the invitation (in which the three bedridden grandparents finally get up). However, as they come upon a big city, the grandparents realize they are still in their bedclothes. The story ends with Marine One landing on the roof of a department store so everyone can be attired in appropriate eveningwear for the visit.

Editions
  (hardcover, 1972)
  (library servings, 1972)
  (board book, 1973)
  (paperback, 1975)
  (paperback, 1986, illustrated by Michael Foreman)
  (paperback, 1988)
  (hardcover, 1995)
  (paperback, 1995)
  (paperback, 1997)
  (library binding, 2001)
  (paperback, 2001)
  (hardcover, 2001)
  (paperback, 2005)
  (audio CD read by Eric Idle)
  (paperback, 2018, colour edition illustrated by Quentin Blake)

References

Charlie and the Chocolate Factory
1972 British novels
Fiction set in 1972
Science fantasy novels
Sequel novels
Alfred A. Knopf books
British children's novels
British fantasy novels
British science fiction novels
Fiction about shapeshifting
Rapid human age change in fiction
Works set in elevators
White House in fiction
1972 children's books
Children's fantasy novels